The Holocaust (Return of Cultural Objects) (Amendment) Act 2019 (c. 20), introduced by Theresa Villiers under the Ten Minute Rule, stopped the Holocaust (Return of Cultural Objects) Act 2009 from lapsing.

A legislative consent motion was agreed by the Scottish Parliament as introduced by Fiona Hyslop on 8 May 2018 to fulfill the requirement of the Sewel convention.

Background 
This Act repeals the 'sunset clause' (in section 4(7)) of the Holocaust (Return of Cultural Objects) Act 2009  which would have meant the act would have expired after 10 years. This means the Spoliation Advisory Panel - a non-governmental advisory body on claims of cultural heritage relating to Nazi artwork - continues to function.

References 

Cultural heritage of the United Kingdom
United Kingdom Acts of Parliament 2019
2019 in British law
The Holocaust and the United Kingdom
Art and cultural repatriation after World War II